National Route 12 (officially, PY12, better known as Ruta Doce) is a highway in Paraguay, which runs from Chaco'i, part of the district of Villa Hayes, to Pozo Hondo, part of the district of Dr. Pedro P. Peña, connecting the western Chaco region to the metropolitan area of Asunción. It's currently paved only from Chaco'i to Tinfunqué National Park.

Distances, cities and towns

The following table shows the distances traversed by PY12 in each different department, showing cities and towns that it passes by (or near).

References

12